Beaver Creek is a  long third-order tributary to the Niobrara River in Holt County, Nebraska.

Watershed

See also

List of rivers of Nebraska

References

Rivers of Holt County, Nebraska
Rivers of Nebraska